The list of shipwrecks in 2011 includes ships sunk, foundered, grounded, or otherwise lost during 2011.

January

1 January

3 January

5 January

9 January

11 January

28 January

30 January

February

4 February

7 February

8 February

10 February

12 February

15 February

17 February

Unknown date

March

1 March

6 March

9 March

11 March

An unknown number of vessels are washed ashore or sunk around the Pacific Rim following an earthquake and tsunami off the north east coast of Japan. Ship casualties include:-

16 March

19 March

20 March

26 March

28 March

29 March

April

6 April

7 April

9 April

13 April

25 April

May

2 May

15 May

18 May

19–20 May

23 May

27 May

June

3 June

4 June

5 June

11 June

14 June

22 June

26 June

July

3 July

5 July

10 July

23 July

25 July

29 July

30 July

31 July

August

3 August

4 August

8 August

9 August

10 August

12 August

17 August

19 August

27 August

30 August

September

1 September

6 September

10 September

15 September

20 September

26 September

28 September

29 September

October

3 October

5 October

6 October

7 October

13 October

14 October

18 October

20 October

28 October

31 October

November

3 November

5 November

9 November

17 November

21 November

27 November

December

5 December

7 December

9 December

10 December

11 December

16 December

17 December

18 December

20 December

25 December

27 December

31 December

Unknown date

References

2011
 
Ship